Scream Aim Fire: Live at Alexandra Palace is the second live DVD released by Welsh heavy metal band Bullet For My Valentine. It was first released on 1 May 2009 on the Xbox LIVE Marketplace for a limited time as part of Xtival '09. The entire show is available for viewing on Qello for the price of a monthly subscription fee.

Track listing
 "Intro"
 "Scream Aim Fire"
 "Take It Out on Me"
 "The Poison"
 "All These Things I Hate (Revolve Around Me)"
 "4 Words (To Choke Upon)"
 "Hand of Blood"
 "Say Goodnight"
 "Eye of the Storm"
 "Tears Don't Fall"
 "Spit You Out"
 "Hearts Burst into Fire"
 "Waking the Demon"
 "Forever and Always"

Personnel
Matthew "Matt" Tuck – vocals, rhythm guitar
Michael "Padge" Paget – lead guitar, backing vocals
Michael "Moose" Thomas – drums
Jason "Jay" James – bass, vocals

References 

Bullet for My Valentine albums